Ujda Chaman is a 2019 Indian Hindi-language comedy-drama  film directed by Abhishek Pathak and produced by Pathak and Kumar Mangat Pathak under the Panorama Studios banner. Starring Sunny Singh, Maanvi Gagroo, Saurabh Shukla, Karishma Sharma and Aishwarya Sakhuja, it is an official remake of the 2017 Kannada dramedy film Ondu Motteya Kathe. It was theatrically released in India on 1 November 2019.

The film is about a balding 30-year-old bachelor who is in search of a wife and is given a deadline to find one or remain celibate forever.

Plot
A 30 year balding Hindi lecturer, Chaman Kohli searches desperately for a suitable girl to marry after his family astrologer warns him that if he doesn't get married before his 31st birthday, then he'll have to spend his whole life in celibacy. He confides in his friend who also happens to be the clerk of the college. He advises him to go and search for a bridesmaid at a wedding as that’s where many relationships are formed. Chaman tries to woo a girl at his friend’s wedding but later discovers her making out with his brother Goldie. He tries to ask his colleagues out on the clerk’s advice but they also deny saying they’ve got their respective boyfriends.

Chaman tries to solve the problem by using a wig, but when his bluff is exposed, he leaves in disgust. A first year student, Aaina, comes to him and consoles him for his mockery by other students. She befriends him and hangs out with him only to get hold of the exam questions. Goldie sees Aaina and Chaman together and tells the family about them making them very happy. She later becomes very indifferent towards him and refuses to even talk. Chaman finds solace on Tinder and meets Apsara, a make up artist but oversized girl. Both of them instantly dislike each other because of their looks and the edited pictures they uploaded but agree on being friends as an excuse to leave the date. Later Chaman offers to drop Apsara and both end up having an accident. In hospital their families bond well and assume them a couple. They set their Roka ceremony much to Chaman’s chagrin, but Apsara starts falling for him. She posts their picture on Facebook which becomes a laughing stock for students who post hate comments, making Chaman really upset. He asks Apsara to delete it when she tries hard to explain to him that people will say some or the other thing but he shouldn’t react on everything and accept himself the way he is.

On their engagement, Chaman texts Apsara that he is not happy with this union and she takes the blame on herself calling off the ceremony. Chaman sulks in private and the clerk notices this and takes him to dinner at his place. He introduces him to his wife who is mute and yet how happy they are as a couple. Later Chaman starts dating a colleague who earlier rejected him. She asks him to meet his parents by wearing his wig. This gives Chaman an epiphany of how honest and pure Apsara was, as she accepted him for his inner beauty and not his debonair looks. He goes and apologises to her and they are seen living happily together.

Cast 

 Sunny Singh as Chaman Kohli 
 Maanvi Gagroo as Apsara Batra 
 Saurabh Shukla as Guru Ji 
 Atul Kumar as Shashi Kohli 
 Grusha Kapoor as Sushma Kohli 
 Gagan Arora as Goldy Kohli 
Rajendra Chawla as Mr. Batra
Suparna Marwah as Mrs. Batra
 Karishma Sharma as Aaina
 Abhilash Chaudhary as Rathi
 Aishwarya Sakhuja as Ekta 
 Sharib Hashmi as Raj Kumar
 Anushka Kaushik as Apsara's sister (uncredited)

Production
Ujda Chaman has been shot in New Delhi, Noida & Ghaziabad. Hansraj College (University of Delhi), Red Fort (Lal Quila), India Gate, Gali Lalten Wali (Azad Market), Vinobapuri, Central Market (Lajpat Nagar), Dilli Haat, Mehrauli, Hauz Khas Village, Sector 30 (Noida) & Yashoda Hospital Ghaziabad.

Marketing and release 
The first look poster of the film was released on 1 October and, on the same day, the trailer was also released by Panorama Studios. The film was released on 1 November 2019.

Reception

Critical response
Ujda Chaman received generally mixed to positive reviews from critics;

Filmfare gave 2.5 stars out of 5 and said, 'Overall, while the film does raise some important issues, it suffers from faulty execution. It comes across as a missed opportunity at best...' Komal Nahta of Film Information said, 'Ujda Chaman is definitely not the laugh riot it ought to have been and is, in that sense, a very disappointing fare.'
Bollywood Hungama gave 2 stars out of 5 and said 'Ujda Chaman has a promising and relatable story but the inconsistent execution and predictable narrative spoils the show.'

Box office
Ujda Chamans opening day domestic collection was 2.35 crore. On the second day, the film collected 3.30 crore. On the third day, the film collected 3.61 crore, taking total opening weekend collection to 9.29 crore.

, with a gross of 12.07 crore in India and 91 lacs overseas, the film has a worldwide gross collection of 12.98 crore.

Soundtrack 

The music is composed by Gourov - Roshin and lyrics written by Devshi Khanduri. Originally song "Outfit" was sung by Guru Randhawa composed by Preet Hundal and lyrics by Guru Randhawa and Ikka.

References

External links
 
 
 

2019 films
Indian black comedy films
2010s Hindi-language films
Fiction about diseases and disorders
Hindi remakes of Kannada films
Films scored by Guru Randhawa
Films scored by Gourov Roshin